The 2006 UCI Track Cycling World Championships were the World Championship for track cycling. They took place in Bordeaux, France from April 13 to April 16, 2006.

Medal table

Medal summary

External links
Results book
2006 UCI Track Cycling World Championships - CM France, April 13-16, 2006 Cycling News

 
Uci Track Cycling World Championships, 2006
Track cycling
UCI Track Cycling World Championships by year
International cycle races hosted by France
UCI Track Cycling World Championships